Salk Oval is a multi-sports venue in Palm Beach, a suburb in the Gold Coast, Australia. It includes an Australian rules football and Cricket ground.

It used by the Palm Beach Currumbin Australian Football Club and the Palm Beach Currumbin Cricket Club. The ground was named after American physician Jonas Salk.

See also

 Sports on the Gold Coast, Queensland

References

Australian rules football grounds
Cricket grounds in Australia
Sports venues on the Gold Coast, Queensland
North East Australian Football League grounds
World Series Cricket venues